The 2016 Russian Figure Skating Championships were held from 23 to 27 December 2015 in Yekaterinburg, Sverdlovsk Oblast. Medals were awarded in the disciplines of men's singles, ladies' singles, pair skating, and ice dancing. The results were among the criteria used to select Russia's teams sent to the 2016 World Championships and 2016 European Championships.

Competitions
In the 2015–16 season, Russian skaters competed in domestic qualifying events and national championships for various age levels. The Russian Cup series led to three events – the Russian Championships, the Russian Junior Championships, and the Russian Cup Final.

Medalists of most important competitions

Senior Championships
The senior Championships were held in Yekaterinburg from 23 to 27 December 2015. Competitors qualified through international success or by competing in the Russian Cup series' senior-level events. The list of competitors was published on 23 December. Ksenia Stolbova / Fedor Klimov (due to Klimov's back pain) and Ksenia Monko / Kirill Khaliavin (due to Monko's injury sustained at the 2015 Rostelecom Cup) withdrew before the start of the competition.

Results

Men

Ladies

Pairs

Ice dancing

Junior Championships
The 2016 Russian Junior Championships were held in Chelyabinsk from 21 to 23 January 2016. Competitors qualified by competing in the Russian Cup series' junior-level events. The results of the January competition were part of the selection criteria for the 2016 Winter Youth Olympics and the 2016 World Junior Championships. The list of qualifiers was published on 12 January 2016. Alena Kostornaia withdrew before the start of the event and was replaced by Elizaveta Iushenko.

Results

Men

Ladies

Pairs

Ice dancing

International team selections

European Championships
Russia's team to the 2016 European Championships was published on 27 December 2015.

Winter Youth Olympics
Russia's team to the 2016 Winter Youth Olympics was published on 23 January 2016.

World Junior Championships
Russia's team to the 2016 World Junior Championships was published on 23 January 2016.

World Championships
Russia's team to the 2016 World Championships was published on 8 March 2016.

References

External links
 
 2016 Russian Championships at the Figure Skating Federation of Russia
 2016 Russian Junior Championships at the Figure Skating Federation of Russia

Russian Figure Skating Championships
Russian Championships
Russian Championships
Figure Skating Championships
Figure Skating Championships